The 2018–19 Jacksonville Dolphins men's basketball team represented Jacksonville University during the 2018–19 NCAA Division I men's basketball season. The Dolphins, led by fifth-year head coach Tony Jasick, played their home games at Swisher Gymnasium on the university's Jacksonville, Florida campus as members of the Atlantic Sun Conference.

Previous season
The Dolphins finished the 2017–18 season 15–18, 8–6 in ASUN play to finish in third place. They defeated Kennesaw State in the quarterfinals of the ASUN tournament before losing in the semifinals to Lipscomb.

Roster

Schedule and results
 
|-
!colspan=9 style=| Non-conference regular season

|-
!colspan=9 style=| Atlantic Sun Conference regular season

|-
!colspan=9 style=| Atlantic Sun tournament
|-

|-

Source

References

Jacksonville Dolphins men's basketball seasons
Jacksonville